The following is a list of professional wrestling attendance records in Puerto Rico. The list is dominated by Puerto Rico's oldest promotion, the World Wrestling Council, which has controlled the industry in the country since its founding in 1973. It was part of the National Wrestling Alliance from 1979 to 1986 and is the last remaining North American member of the original NWA territory system.

According to this list, 6 events are from WWC's annual Aniversario supercard, which in the late-1980s had been held exclusively at the Juan Ramón Loubriel Stadium which typically has a seating capacity of at least 22,000 people or more. Only ten of the attendances listed are non-WWC events, with eight being from the U.S.-based World Wrestling Entertainment including a co-promotional effort with IWA Puerto Rico in 1999. WWE's presence on the island has been gradually increasing since holding its New Year's Revolution pay-per-view (PPV) event in 2005. All but nine of the events have been held in the capital city of San Juan, while seven have been held in Bayamón and two in Ponce, Puerto Rico.

Events and attendances

Historical

See also

List of professional wrestling attendance records
List of professional wrestling attendance records in Europe
List of professional wrestling attendance records in Japan
List of professional wrestling attendance records in the United Kingdom
List of WWE attendance records
List of professional wrestling attendance records in Oceania

References

External links
Supercards & Tournaments: World Wrestling Council at ProWrestlingHistory.com
Attendance records in Puerto Rico at Wrestlingdata.com

P
Attendance records
Professional wrestling in Puerto Rico
Puerto Rico sport-related lists